Bar Aftab-e Akbar (also Romanized as Bar Āftāb-e Ākbar; also known as Barāftāb) is a village in Chelo Rural District, Chelo District, Andika County, Khuzestan Province, Iran. At the 2006 census, its population was 154, in 23 families.

References 

Populated places in Andika County